Employee motivation, also known as work motivation, is a feature of employees that refers to how motivated they are to work. It has a significant impact on employee productivity and efficiency." While motivation is defined as why individuals do or participate in certain behaviors. 

Studies have shown that those who feel motivated tend to perform better than those who are not.  Employee engagement influences just about every key area of your organization, including profitability, sales, customer experience, employee turnover, and more. It is understood that  humans have a psychological need for "autonomy, competence relatedness. There is a correlation-ship between motivation and employee's engagement, and the productivity of the organization Engagement is a sense of purpose, belonging, and commitment to an organization, whereas motivation is the willpower and drive to act on those feelings. Employee engagement lays the groundwork for your employees to do their best work, whereas motivation provides the fuel or energy to get the job done. 

When managers were asked how they know the difference between the engaged and disengaged employee, they announced that if an employee is engaged, he will do his best to be creative at work, he will be enjoying what he or she is doing, while if the employee is disengaged, he will not be interested in what he is doing, and he will not do anything more than what he or she is told to do. Since work motivation is now considered as an important topic, many theories came up to the stage .

Theories of motivation

Need theory 
Maslow need theory announced in his article published in 1943 that human beings have five needs to live a healthy life; physiological needs, safety, belonging, esteem, and self-actualization. This theory needs are considered as an important source of motivation in the workplace where employees seek to satisfy these needs from basic and more necessary to the top of the hierarchy. Need theory focuses on what an employee needs to get motivated toward a specific task or activity.

Expectancy theory 
Expectancy theory suggests that the employee will be motivated to do a task at a certain level of performance, if he expects that he will get desirable outcomes by exerting efforts at that level. Expectancy theory focus on the estimation, perception, and thoughts of an employee. It also concerns about how an employee behaves and chooses between alternative behaviors. Estes and Polinck announced in their international journal that expectancy theory has three main factors; - valence: which refers to the value of the outcome the employee will have. 

It could be positive or negative, 2- instrumentality: which depends on the employee's perception of the work environment, in other words, if an employee believes that a certain level of performance will lead to a desirable outcome such as extra pay, or he believes that performing at a certain level of effort will help him avoid undesirable outcomes such as being fired, he will be motivated towards his job.

Equity theory 
The fair process effect, a term was first appeared in 1979 in a published article for Folgers and his co-author. Equity theory focuses on the inputs and outputs. inputs refers to what an employee gives an organization such as education level and performance, while outputs represents the benefits the employee gets from the organization. The relationship between inputs and outputs forms a ratio that is not so much important in determining work motivation but the comparison an employee makes between his ratio and a ratio of another employee, this kind of comparison could lead to low level of motivation, if the employee feels unfair treatment. 

When an employee perceives that his input-output ratio is equal to the ratio of the other employees (referent), he will be motivated to increase his inputs to get the same outputs as the referent. If employee feels fair treatment, a sense of satisfaction will be reached, in turns leads to high motivation level and loyalty to the organization.

Organizational Justice Theory 
Organizational justice theory explains that employees are affected, not by how the company treats them, but by how they perceive the company treating them.

it has four main forms.
Distributive justice : Depending on the equity theory, managers should achieving equity while distributing the outcomes of the organization to get the most out of their employees.
Informational justice :  Depends on the role of the managers to explain their decision about distributing the outcomes. Managers should share their ideas with the employee, make them participate in making decisions, and appraise their employees' contributions.
Interpersonal justice : Refers to the fair relationships between manager and his employees such as respect and courtesy. Employees don't like to be treated differently, they like to be equally treated. so, manager should consider that his treatment could affect the motivational level of the employee.
Procedural justice : Depends on the processes that are taken while distributing the outcomes. procedural justice is considered important as when an employee feels his inputs will be well evaluated, he puts more efforts to get more favorable outcomes. When the processes used to make decision of outcomes distribution are fair, the motivation level of an employee will be high, therefore their performance level.

Intrinsic and extrinsic motivational factors 
Intrinsic motivation factor comes from within the employee himself, gives him sense of satisfaction, while extrinsic motivation comes from outside and motivates the employee toward achieving a specific task in which he may no be interested. Intrinsic and extrinsic motivation are the key for improving the efficiency of the company. In order to achieve the organizational goals, managers should take in consideration the needs of their employee, and understand that each employee has his own specific needs that are needed to be engaged and motivated.

Intrinsic Motivational Factors

Relationship with co-worker 
Relationships between employees help improve their engagement. Some managers mentioned that some activities outside the workplace build strong relationship between employees therefore their engagement. As we mentioned before in the Maslow's need theory, employees seek to satisfy the belonging need by making strong relationship in the workplace, therefore they feel safe, and more secure, that in turn will increases their engagement.

Relationship with manager 
Positive relationship with the manager is a good sign of engagement at work. Manager should balance between personal and professional relationships with employees. Managers should encourage their employees, and have supportive relationships with them. the more safety employees feel, the more engaged they will be. 2007-2008 a study was conducted to determine the relationship between motivation and employee engagement 90,000 employees from different countries and industries announced that the relationship between the managers and their employees is considered as the backbone of the engagement. The more respectful the manager is, the more engaged the employee will be for the company.

Employee Well-Being 
When employee feels like he is treated emotionally, whenever he is sick or stressed, in a good way and get support by the manager and co-workers, he will be more intrinsically motivated, engaged, and productive. managers should consider the physical availability of their employee, and not to overload them with time or tasks that they can't do it physically. Eder and r. Eisenberger reported that when employees work for a company that cares about well-beings, they are happier at their jobs, experience less stress and are motivated to perform at a high level.

Extrinsic Motivational Factors

Work environment 
It is important to provide employee with the necessary equipment they need to do their tasks. An example of equipment that would help them complete their task would be a computer, telephone, materials (paper, pen, notepad, etc).

Training and Career Development 
Courses and resources that add new knowledge and skills to the employee increase his level of engagement. These resources should be in connection with what he or she is doing, related to their job, to get the most out of it, or otherwise their engagement will be badly affected. On the Maslow hierarchy needs, we can see self-actualization need in which employee needs to us his or her abilities and skills on his everyday life to feel satisfied and motivated. On the previous fact, managers should help their employees improve their knowledge and skills as training and career development was emphasized by employees to be as an important extrinsic motivational factor.

Compensation 
Financial compensation and non-financial compensation satisfy two different needs. financial compensation satisfies the physiological needs, while non-financial compensation satisfies psychological needs in which every employee needs feedback and recognition for what he or she is doing. Despite compensation has some positive effect on engagement, which doesn't last for a long time, it also has harmful impacts. When an employee feels like he receives less financial rewards than another employee who do roughly the same job, the engagement will be negatively effected.

Organizational Policies 
Flexibility is considered as much important as any other external factor when we build the structure of the organization because it opens the door for the employee to feel safe, be more creative, and productive.

Intrinsic -VS- Extrinsic motivators 

 HR consultancy and research institute performed a study that showed that intrinsic effect have much more strong relationship with employee engagement than extrinsic effect.
 The extrinsic motivators are considered as important factor for any organization that seeks high productivity. when intrinsic motivators are absent, extrinsic motivators are the only drivers for the favorable outcomes for the employee and the company itself.
 Extrinsic motivators are used not only to establish a specific behavior but also to increase the performance and productivity. Workers tend to do their best, when their performance its connected directly with rewards, and when they receive positive feedback.
 Extrinsic motivators could fade and diminish the intrinsic motivation of a person, by making him doing the job for the purpose of the money and rewards. If the rewards is cut off, the person's performance will decrease and dwindle. plus, to keep the motivation of a person continue, the rewards should go up gradually.
 Intrinsic motivation makes people like what they do, for their own pleasure, not for the money.
 Intrinsic motivation changes overtime, as we get older, and as our desire to make something decreases.

Motivation in public and private organizations 

 Longitudinal study of private organization managers was performed between 1946 and 1995 to identify how managers appraise the influence of intrinsic and extrinsic factors on the productivity and performance of their employees. Kovach in 1995 found that the most 10 strong drivers for employees to engage in a job are; 1- good wages, 2- job security, 3- promotion and growth in the organization, 4- good working condition, 5- interesting work, 6- personal loyalty to employees, 7- tactful discipline, 8- full appreciation of work done, 9- sympathetic help with personal problems, 10- feeling of being on one thing. all these factor were found as the most important drivers regardless the order of their importance on employee engagement.
 A study was performed to compare the needs required by public and private employees to be motivated. It's findings were that the most important factors for public employee to be motivated towards his job was stable and secure future compared to his private counterpart who prefers the high salary to be at the top of his needs. on the other side, high prestige and social status comes at the least important needs required by public sector employee, while the private sector employee ranks freedom from the supervision to be at the bottom of his required list.

References 

Human resource management